Gilles Roulin  (born 14 May 1994) is a Swiss alpine skier who competes internationally.

He participated in the 2018 Winter Olympics.

References

External links
 

1994 births
Living people
Swiss male alpine skiers 
Olympic alpine skiers of Switzerland 
Alpine skiers at the 2018 Winter Olympics